The world's longest ships are listed according to their overall length (LOA), which is the maximum length of the vessel measured between the extreme points in fore and aft. In addition, the ships' deadweight tonnage (DWT) and/or gross tonnage (GT) are presented as they are often used to describe the size of a vessel.

The ships are listed by type. For each type, the list includes current record-holders either as individual ships, ship classes or standard designs, up to four runner-ups, and all longer ships that have been scrapped.

Oil tankers

Bulk carriers

Container ships

Passenger ships

Other 
Other longest ships of their type.

See also 

 List of large sailing vessels
 List of large sailing yachts
 List of longest naval ships
 List of motor yachts by length
 Timeline of largest passenger ships
 List of longest wooden ships
 List of largest ships by gross tonnage

References 

Longest Ships
Longest Ships
Ships